Hendon Reform Synagogue, a member of the Movement for Reform Judaism, was a synagogue in Hendon in the London Borough of Barnet. The community was founded in 1949. Its senior rabbi was Steven Katz, who succeeded his father, Arthur Katz.

Its synagogue building, which was consecrated on 14 January 1968, closed in 2017 when the community merged with Edgware & District Reform Synagogue to form Edgware & Hendon Reform Synagogue.

Notable members

Sam Little (born 1975), professional golfer

See also
 List of former synagogues in the United Kingdom
 List of Jewish communities in the United Kingdom
 Movement for Reform Judaism

References

External links

 The Movement for Reform Judaism
 Hendon Reform Synagogue on Jewish Communities and Records – UK (hosted by jewishgen.org)

Buildings and structures in the London Borough of Barnet
Reform synagogues in the United Kingdom
Synagogues in London